Ilona and Judit Gófitz (Hungarian: Gófitz Ilona és Judit; in contemporary publications: Helen and Judith of Szőny), also known as the Hungarian Sisters, were conjoined twins from Szőny, Hungary who lived from October 19, 1701 to February 8, 1723. The sisters, who were pygopagus (joined at the pelvis), were examined by doctors and exhibited to curious crowds throughout Europe. At the age of nine, the pair retired to a convent in Presburg, Kingdom of Hungary, where they spent the rest of their lives. They died within hours of each other.

After seeing them in London, Alexander Pope wrote a poem about the sisters:

Two sisters wonderful to behold, who have thus grown as one,
That naught their bodies can divide, no power beneath the sun.
The town of Szoenii gave them birth, hard by far-famed Komorn,
Which noble fort may all the arts of Turkish sultans scorn.
Lucina, woman's gentle friend, did Helen first receive;
And Judith, when three hours had passed, her mother's womb did leave.

One urine passage serves for both; one anus, so they tell;
The other parts their numbers keep, and serve their owners well.
Their parents poor did send them forth, the world to travel through,
That this great wonder of the age should not be hid from view.
The inner parts concealed do lie hid from our eyes, alas!
But all the body here you view erect in solid brass.

References

Further reading
 
 

Conjoined twins
1701 births
1723 deaths
Hungarian twins